Rikard Moorman (born 3 August 1961 in Amsterdam) is a Dutch cyclist. He competed in the men's team pursuit event at the 1984 Summer Olympics, finishing in tenth place.

See also
 List of Dutch Olympic cyclists
 List of people from Amsterdam

References

1961 births
Living people
Dutch male cyclists
Olympic cyclists of the Netherlands
Cyclists at the 1984 Summer Olympics
Cyclists from Amsterdam